The Danieli Piuma is a family of Italian high-wing, strut-braced, pusher configuration single-seat motor gliders that was designed by Tiziano Danieli of Schio and supplied as plans for amateur construction.

Design and development
The Piuma was designed to be an inexpensive, easy-to-fly and easy-to-build ultralight motor glider. The first model was initially just called the Piuma, but as other models were developed it became known as the Piuma Original.

The Piuma is constructed from wood and finished with doped fabric. The semi-tapered  span wing is supported by a single lift strut on each side and has air brakes. The engine is mounted behind the cockpit. The specified engine is the  KFM 107er, but engines of  can be fitted. The landing gear is of tricycle configuration and made from steel with rubber shock-absorbers, with an auxiliary tailwheel and fits wheel pants to reduce drag. The tail is cruciform. Cabin width is 

The designer estimated that it would take a builder 1000 hours to complete the aircraft from the plans. The plans cost US$220 in 1998 and included a 30-page construction manual.

Variants
Piuma Original
Initial version with  span wing, first flown in 1990. Eight reported completed in 2003.
Piuma E
Piuma Evolution
Improved model with a wider cockpit, more streamlined fuselage, redesigned tail, new lift struts, electrically retractable nose wheel. main landing gear made from a wood/fibreglass sandwich and a more reclined seat. Four reported completed in 2003.
Piuma Tourer
One reported completed in 2003.
Piuma Twin Evolution
Two seat model with side-by-side configuration seating, introduced in 1998 and inspired by the Tourer.

Specifications (Piuma Original)

See also

References

External links

1990s Italian sailplanes
Homebuilt aircraft
Aircraft first flown in 1990
Single-engined pusher aircraft
Motor gliders